The All Japan Band Association (AJBA) (全日本吹奏楽連盟/Zennihon Suisōgaku Renmei) is an organization that exists solely for the purpose of facilitating annual music competition among Japanese wind bands. This competition has largely promoted the concert band idiom (called buraban in Japanese), but in recent years AJBA has also included separate entries for marching band and smaller chamber music ensembles within its national competition.

The AJBA competition includes categories for elementary school, middle school, high school, university, company, and community bands. It is an extremely competitive three-tiered contest, with local, regional, and national levels of competition. In some categories - middle school for example - the school bands from the most competitive urban districts that manage to reach the national level of competition are statistically among the top 0.5% in all of Japan.

The renowned Tokyo Kosei Wind Orchestra is usually hired to make the definitive premier recordings of the required pieces commissioned each year for AJBA's national competition. The final (national) stage of the competition is regularly held in Fumon Hall, an auditorium located on the campus of the Rissho Kosei Kai religious organization in central Tokyo.

Not to be confused with the Japan Marching Band Association (JMBA) (一般社団法人日本マーチングバンド協会)

World's Largest Music Contest
The All Japan Band Association annual contest appears to be the world's largest music competition in terms of the number of active contestants, with approximately 800,000 competing musicians in more than 14,000 bands. The other largest music competitions in the world are the Eurovision and American Idol competitions in the field of pop music singing. While these do not exceed the AJBA competition in terms of the number of competitors, they may be larger in terms of the number of individual entrants, operating budgets, or fans (as these contests involve popular music, are marketed internationally, and enjoy a much higher global profile).

AJBA Contest Divisions

The following chart displays a breakdown of competing wind bands in terms of region and category:

1 October 2010 statistics

Since the average Japanese wind band has around 45 to 55 members, the total national figure probably exceeds 800,000 contestants in any given year, and according to the most recent figures (2010) may even exceed 1 million.

See also
Buraban
Wind band
School band
Education in Japan
Music of Japan

References

Further reading
All Japan Band Association Official Website
David G. Hebert (2012). Wind Bands and Cultural Identity in Japanese Schools (Dordrecht and New York: Springer Press).
David G. Hebert (2008). “Inside the World's Largest Music Competition: Application of an Ensemble Ethos Model,” Cultural Diversity in Music Education (CDIME-IX) - conference proceedings (Seattle, March 20–23, 2008). .
David G. Hebert (2007). “Kokusaiteki Shitendemiru Nihonno Suisogaku,” (tr. Japanese Wind Bands in International Perspective). Japanese Band Directors Association Journal, Vol. 13 (pp. 35–46).
David G. Hebert (2005). Music Competition, Cooperation, and Community: An Ethnography of a Japanese School Band. Doctoral Dissertation, University of Washington. Ann Arbor: Proquest/UMI.
David G. Hebert (2001). “Hoshina and Ito: Japanese Wind Band Composers,” Journal of Band Research, Vol. 37, No. 1 (pp. 61–77).
Miho Takekawa. (2011). Japanese Band Culture: How it is Sustained. Doctoral dissertation, University of Washington (ProQuest Dissertations and Theses).
UW Wind Ensemble Breezes Through Japan
Tim Reynish on Japanese band repertoire
Bravo Music, international distributor of Japanese wind band compositions, recordings, videos
Philip V. Bohlman (2004). The Music of European Nationalism. ABC-CLIO [scholarly discussion of the Eurovision competition].
Nielsen ratings for the American Idol competition

External links 

  

Wind bands
Music organizations based in Japan